The Women's Malaysian Open Squash Championships 2012 is the women's edition of the 2012 Malaysian Open Squash Championships, which is a tournament of the WSA World Series event Gold (prize money: $70,000). The event took place in Kuala Lumpur, in Malaysia, from the 12th to 15th of September. Raneem El Weleily won her first Malaysian Open trophy, beating Nicol David in the final.

Prize money and ranking points
For 2012, the prize purse was $70,000. The prize money and points breakdown is as follows:

Seeds

Draw and results

See also
WSA World Series 2012
Malaysian Open Squash Championships
Men's Malaysian Open Squash Championships 2012

References

External links
WSA Malaysian Open Squash Championships website
CIMB Malaysian Open 2012 Squashsite website

Squash tournaments in Malaysia
Kuala Lumpur Open Squash Championships
2012 in Malaysian women's sport
2010s in Kuala Lumpur
Sport in Kuala Lumpur
2012 in women's squash